The Men's individual pursuit CP Div 4 track cycling event at the 2004 Summer Paralympics was competed from 19 to 20 September. It was won by Christopher Scott, representing .

Qualifying

19 Sept. 2004, 11:25

1st round

Heat 1
20 Sept. 2004, 11:40

Heat 2

Heat 3

Heat 4

Final round

20 Sept. 2004, 14:35
Gold

Bronze

References

M